The Indiana Southern Railroad  is a short line or Class III railroad operating in the United States state of Indiana. It began operations in 1992 as a RailTex property, and was acquired by RailAmerica in 2000. RailAmerica was itself acquired by Genesee & Wyoming in December 2012.

Indiana Southern Railroad operates  of track from Indianapolis to Evansville. From Mars Hill (a neighborhood on the southwest side of Indianapolis) southwest through Martinsville and Spencer to Bee Hunter in Greene County, the ISRR runs on tracks that once made up the majority of the former Indianapolis & Vincennes Branch of the Pennsylvania Railroad. State Route 67 parallels the ISRR along much of this section. From Bee Hunter to Elnora the ISRR has trackage rights over the Indiana Rail Road. ISRR tracks resume from Elnora through Washington in  Daviess County,  Petersburg in Pike County, Oakland City in Gibson County,  Elberfeld in Warrick County and Daylight in Vanderburgh County before terminating in Evansville  along the former New York Central's Evansville & Indianapolis Branch.

Locomotive fleet 

The Indiana Southern began operations with a fleet of 10 ex-CSX EMD GP40 locomotives which were rebuilt without dynamic brakes and identified as GP40-1s.

As of 2018, the ISRR currently operates 10 ex-BNSF EMD SD40-2 locomotives acquired from First Union Railway Equipment in 2013 after the railroad became Genesee & Wyoming property. Additionally, the railroad owns two G&W rebuilt GP40-3 locomotives, 3051 and 3052. ISRR 3051 was rebuilt from ISRR 4051, one of the original GP40-1s originally fleeted and is the only remaining original member of the fleet. Finally, ISRR operates an ex-Toledo, Peoria & Western GP40 painted in the Rail America paint scheme. It is the only remaining member of the fleet not in Genesee & Wyoming paint.

Operations 

The railroad's traffic comes mainly from coal and grain products, including corn and soybeans. The ISRR hauled around 70,000 carloads in 2008.

The Indiana Southern interchanges in Indianapolis with CSX in CSX's Crawford Yard, the Indiana Rail Road in Switz City and Beehunter, Norfolk Southern in Oakland City in Evansville the railroad terminates with a connection at CSX's (ex-C&EI) Wansford yard, just west of U.S. Route 41, near the Evansville Regional Airport.

Just south of Indianapolis, the railroad serves transloading facility Kid Glove Services.

The railroad serves industries in Mooresville and a salt unloading facility in Martinsville. A siding between Whitaker and Gosport is regularly used for car storage; as is a small yard in Worthington on the former New York Central trackage.

The railroad supplies coal to power plants in Edwardsport and Petersburg. There are around 2 trains per week supplying the Edwardsport plant with coal and carrying byproducts from the plant.

The railroad also serves a grain elevator in Plainville and the Grain Processing Corporation in Washington.

References

External links 

 Indiana Southern Railway official webpage - Genesee and Wyoming website

Indiana railroads
RailAmerica
Spin-offs of Conrail